The County Hall is a municipal building complex in Pegs Lane, Hertford, Hertfordshire. The building, which is the headquarters of Hertfordshire County Council, is a Grade II* listed building.

History
The original Shire Hall for Hertfordshire was located in Fore Street in Hertford. After deciding that Shire Hall was too restricted for future expansion, county leaders chose to procure a new county headquarters: the site they selected was open land located just off Pegs Lane.

Construction of the new building began in spring 1937. It was designed by Charles Holloway James and Stephen Rowland Pierce in the Neo-Georgian style with Scandinavian elements, built by C. Miskin & Son of St Albans and opened without ceremony in summer 1939. The design for the building involved an asymmetrical main frontage facing the Bullocks Lane; the left section of three bays featured a portico with four full height piers supporting a frieze with the words "Tertium iam annum regnante Georgio VI haec curia aedificata est" ("This building was constructed during the third year of the reign of George VI"); the portico contained a doorway flanked by square windows on the ground floor and it contained tall sash windows in a recess on the first floor; there was a copper-clad cupola at roof level; the right section contained a loggia of eleven bays on the ground floor and seven sash windows on the first floor. The principal room was the council chamber which was contained in a curved structure which jutted out of the main building to the west.

The Hertfordshire Local Defence Volunteers was formed at County Hall, to provide a secondary line of defence in case of invasion by the forces of Nazi Germany and other Axis powers during the Second World War, in 1940. The Hertfordshire Film Archive was established at the building in 1978. Sculptures of two deer designed by Stephen Elson were erected outside County Hall, to celebrate the fiftieth anniversary of the building, in 1989.

Works of art in County Hall include a portrait of the Lord Chancellor, John Somers, 1st Baron Somers, by Godfrey Kneller and a portrait of the local member of parliament, William Plumer, by Thomas Lawrence.

References

Sources
 Foster, Janet; Sheppard, Julia (2000) British Archives: A Guide to Archive Resources in the UK, Palgrave Macmillan, 
 Robinson, Gwennah. (1978) Barracuda Guide to County History, Vol III: Hertfordshire.  Chesham: Barracuda Books.  .

Grade II* listed buildings in Hertfordshire
Buildings and structures in Hertford
Hertfordshire County Council
H
Government buildings completed in 1939